Elizabeth Quay is a mixed-use development project in the Perth central business district. Focusing on an area located on the north shore of Perth Water near the landmark Swan Bells, the precinct being developed by the project was named in honour of the former Queen Elizabeth II during her Diamond Jubilee.

The project includes construction of an artificial inlet on what was previously the Esplanade Reserve, and modifications to the surrounding environs including Barrack Square. The project plan shows nine building sites.

Planning Minister John Day and Premier Colin Barnett turned the first ground at the Esplanade Reserve on 26 April 2012, and Barnett announced the name "Elizabeth Quay" on 28 May 2012. Construction of the inlet and associated infrastructure were completed in January 2016, ahead of the Perth International Arts Festival and Fringe World. The quay was officially opened on 29 January 2016. Construction of the associated buildings has been estimated to be completed at varying times, with the firstThe Ritz Carlton Hotel and the adjacent residential towersopening on 15 November 2019. Alongside this, the Metropolitan Redevelopment Authority's marketing and sales

Announcements and construction
In February 2011, Premier Colin Barnett and Perth Lord Mayor Lisa Scaffidi confirmed plans for the project and funding which included $270 million from the 2011/12 state budget. The total government outlay would be $440 million with $134 million recovered from property sales to developers.

The project created significant changes to adjacent features such as Riverside Drive, Barrack Square and environs. Other nearby sites such as Supreme Court Gardens and Langley Park were affected through changes in use or additional use.  Nearby heritage listed Lawson Apartments and the Weld Club were affected due to pile driving and obstruction of views.
The JJ Talbot Hobbs memorial, a feature of Anzac Day ceremonies for over sixty years, was relocated to the entrance of the Supreme Court Gardens. The Esplanade Kiosk, built in 1927 in the Federation Arts and Crafts style, was dismantled and rebuilt, brick by brick, as a kiosk on the island feature in the new inlet.

While some of the trees in the reserve and surrounding areas were retained, the Moreton Bay Figs along Barrack Street were removed and replaced with London plane trees.
The State Government identified project returns in the order of $1.7 million on the sale of real estate sites to commercial developers, with the whole development projected as a $2.6 billion investment opportunity. There was debate on the speculative nature of the estimates.

The Metropolitan Redevelopment Authority launched a publicity campaign for the development, with the slogan "The river. The city. Together again." and also had a range of panels on screens surrounding the development site repeating anecdotes about the former esplanade area, as well as text of the material found on the website, and other public relations material.

On 21 April 2012, the MRA released new design guidelines for the development and called for submissions on a second amendment to the Metropolitan Region Scheme. The Minister for Planning granted approval for public comment on the redevelopment scheme and amendments, and the Metropolitan Redevelopment Board approved the Draft Perth Waterfront Design Guidelines. MRA chairman Eric Lumsden made comment on the MRA role in the process.

Opposition campaigns

Following the announcement, the proposals created extensive public debate and opposition due to its supposed failure to sustain respect for heritage, and potential risks to the ecology of the river.

At a "Foreshore Forum" in 2011, organised by the History Council of Western Australia, speakers examined the history and heritage of the site, and expressed concerns about the way in which the heritage aspects of the site were to be interpreted. Speakers suggested that a thorough archaeological examination of the site for European artefacts associated with the early commercial maritime activities and later recreational bathing activities on the site should be included as part of any digging for the proposed inlet. Subsequent discoveries during the excavation process have included a set of timber poles and timber "steps", consistent with pier construction of the 19th century and the formwork for the Barrack Square retaining wall.

Concerns were raised about the impact on the Perth road network resulting from the diversion of Riverside Drive traffic around the new inlet.

As part of the proposed works the Graham Farmer Freeway had additional lanes installed in the Northbridge Tunnel to encourage motorists to bypass the city. The Royal Automobile Club raised early concerns that loss of the emergency lanes might affect emergency response times. Although a tunnel, either under the inlet, or as part of one of the suggested alternative schemes, has previously been dismissed, the suggestion that a tunnel might be built at some time in the future has not been totally dismissed.

A lobby group named "City Gatekeepers" headed by urban planner Linley Lutton was formed to oppose the plans. The group described the plans as being "badly flawed" and forced through without opportunity for public consultation or comment.  Between 500 and 2000 people (depending on the source of the crowd estimate) attended a protest rally organised by the group on the Esplanade on 26 February 2012. Kate Doust, MLC, presented two petitions against the development, one with 8667 signatures and a second with 662 signatures, to the Western Australian Legislative Council on 6 March 2012. A third petition, containing 1,117 signatures, was tabled on 29 March 2012.  The City Gatekeepers also released a number of alternative concept designs, one of which included a landbridge over Riverside Drive, and all featuring the retention of all or most of the Esplanade, based upon the heritage values of the site.

Similar comments have been made by other planning and design professionals and by the Western Australian Policy Forum.

CityVision also released a number of alternative plans.

Supporters of the project noted that the parcel of land was reclaimed from the Swan River in the 1930s, leading to questions of its heritage value as a decades-old predominantly grassed area and road.

Other problems

Water quality in water park 

The water park was closed in February 2016 due to widespread contamination with the bacterium known as Pseudomonas aeruginosa. The approvals for opening the park in January were rushed through with special powers and lack of testing, as reported when the park re-opened 10 months later.

Water quality in inlet 
A proposed triathlon leg to be swum in the inlet was cancelled in March 2016 due to high levels of fecal bacteria.  During the 2012 planning top water experts and experienced river users had commented about the poor flow in front of that section: "...the stretch of the Swan River in front of the city was the worst flushing part of the entire system. ...There was an old timer who came by when we were in the boat and said, 'Jorg, why are they building this thing over there? When I was a kid all the garbage used to collect in that corner'." Similar comments were published from long-time cruise operators in the region. The inlet was officially excised from the river so is only subject to monthly water testing by a private contractor, in contrast to the government weekly testing of the main river water.

Contractors
ARM Architecture were the architects on the development. Urban planner Richard Weller was a lead consultant. Weller also had made comment in his book Boomtown 2050 about the development as an experiment on bringing in new high rise development in the CBD.

The Perth firm Hocking Heritage Studio has identified its involvement with the project.

Leighton Contractors and its parent CIMIC Group, were awarded the principal construction contract in December 2012.  Construction included a new inlet, associated roads, parks, promenades, and an island with connecting bridge within a  parcel of land.  The contract value was $210 million as at 31 December 2012.

Transport
The Esplanade Busport and Esplanade railway station were renamed as the Elizabeth Quay Bus Station and Elizabeth Quay railway station shortly after the Quay's opening in January 2016.

Transperth runs ferries between Elizabeth Quay Jetty and Mends Street Jetty at South Perth, and an electric ferry service operates between Elizabeth Quay ferry terminal and Claisebrook Cove.

A cable car to Kings Park has been allowed for in the plans, although this is not included in the initial phase.

Public art
Several pieces of public art adorn Elizabeth Quay:
 Spanda, a  abstract sculpture
 First Contact, a  depiction of a bird in a boat
 A statue of Bessie Rischbieth

See also
 Islands of Perth, Western Australia
 Perth waterfront development proposals

References

Further reading

External links

 
Metropolitan Redevelopment Authority
The Esplanade (Perth)
Suspension bridges in Australia